Matthew Hayden Koperniak (born February 8, 1998) is an English–born American professional baseball outfielder in the St. Louis Cardinals organization.

Amateur career
Koperniak grew up in Adams, Massachusetts and attended Hoosac Valley High School, where he played baseball, basketball, and football.

Koperniak attended Trinity College and played college baseball career for the Trinity Bantams. He batted for a .310 average as a freshman. He was named first team All-New England Small College Athletic Conference (NESCAC) after batting .388 with 47 hits, five home runs, and 20 runs batted in (RBIs) in 33 games played. As a junior, Koperniak batted .394 with 63 hits, 13 doubles, three triples, six home runs, and 31 RBIs. In 2019, he briefly played collegiate summer baseball with the Harwich Mariners of the Cape Cod Baseball League. Koperniak's senior season was canceled after three games due to the coronavirus pandemic. He initially intended to transfer to Kansas State University for his final season of collegiate eligibility.

Professional career
The St. Louis Cardinals signed Koperniak as an undrafted free agent on June 16, 2020. He was assigned to the Palm Beach Cardinals of Low-A Southeast at the start of the 2021 season. He slashed .322 /.443 /.470 in 58 games with Palm Beach before being promoted to Peoria Chiefs of High-A Central at the beginning of August. Koperniak had six hits in 14 at-bats over four games for the Chiefs and was promoted a second time to the Double-A Springfield Cardinals. Over 95 games total between the three clubs, he hit .306 with seven home runs, 41 RBIs, and 25 doubles. He returned to Springfield for the 2022 season and also played in two games for the Triple-A Memphis Redbirds. Over 108 games between the two teams, Koperniak slashed .291/.364/.443 with 14 home runs, 59 RBIs, and 12 stolen bases.

Koperniak played for the Great Britain national baseball team in the 2023 World Baseball Classic.

References

External links
Trinity Bantams bio

Harwich Mariners players
1998 births
Living people
Trinity Bantams baseball players
Memphis Redbirds players
Palm Beach Cardinals players
Peoria Chiefs players
Springfield Cardinals players
Baseball players from Massachusetts
Great Britain national baseball team players
2023 World Baseball Classic players